Mitch Ronnie Brundle (born 4 December 1994) is an English professional football manager and former player, currently managing National League South side Dover Athletic.

Career
Brundle was born in Croydon, London. He joined League One club Yeovil Town as a first-year scholar in May 2011, having formerly been a member of the youth systems of Millwall and Cambridge United. Following the completion of his two-year scholarship, he was released along with his fellow scholars.

Following his release by Yeovil, Brundle signed for League One club Bristol City. On 31 January 2014, Brundle joined League Two club Cheltenham Town on loan until the end of the season. Brundle made his Football League debut in a 1–0 victory against Newport County on 22 February 2014. Brundle returned from his loan spell at Cheltenham having made seven appearances for the League Two club. At the end of the 2013–14 season, Brundle was released by Bristol City after failing to make an appearance.

Brundle signed for Conference Premier club Braintree Town on 30 July 2014 on a one-year contract.

On 15 January 2016, Brundle joined National League South club Hemel Hempstead Town on loan for one month.

Brundle signed for Braintree's fellow National League club Gateshead on 27 June 2016 on a one-year contract. He was released by Gateshead after just one season at the club.

Following his release from Gateshead, Brundle signed for fellow National League club Dover Athletic on 28 May 2017 on a two-year contract.

Brundle signed for Dover's National League rivals Dagenham & Redbridge on 26 June 2019 on a two-year contract. He was released by Dagenham along with five others in June 2021 following the expiration of his contract.

Brundle signed for Barnet in July 2021 on a two-year contract. He left the club in January 2022 by mutual consent.

The following month he joined Farnborough. Despite gaining promotion with the club, it was announced that Brundle would leave at the end of his contract in June.

On 2 July 2022, Brundle returned to Dover Athletic following their relegation to the National League South, taking on the role of player/assistant manager. Following the departure of Andy Hessenthaler in January 2023, Brundle was given joint-caretaker charge of the first-team with academy manager Mike Sandmann. He was given the job on a permanent basis on 16 January 2023, making him the youngest manager ever in English football.

Career statistics

References

External links
Profile at the Dagenham & Redbridge F.C. website

1994 births
Living people
Footballers from Croydon
English footballers
Association football midfielders
Yeovil Town F.C. players
Bristol City F.C. players
Cheltenham Town F.C. players
Braintree Town F.C. players
Hemel Hempstead Town F.C. players
Gateshead F.C. players
Dover Athletic F.C. players
Dagenham & Redbridge F.C. players
Barnet F.C. players
Farnborough F.C. players
English Football League players
National League (English football) players
Southern Football League players
Dover Athletic F.C. managers
National League (English football) managers